SCAR may refer to:

 FN SCAR (Special Operations Forces Combat Assault Rifle)
 SCAR, ICAO airport code for Chacalluta International Airport in Arica, Chile
 SCAR, used by some athletic sports networks to refer to the South Carolina Gamecocks
 Scientific Committee on Antarctic Research, part of the International Council for Science (ICSU)
 Southern Campaigns of the American Revolution, generated around 80,000 pension applications from soldiers who participated
 Squadra Corse Alfa Romeo, European name of the video game Alfa Romeo Racing Italiano
 Sub-Caliber Aircraft Rocket, a U.S. Navy training rocket
 Supercheap Auto Racing, sponsor for several Australian-based racing teams

See also
 Scar (disambiguation)
 Scarred (disambiguation)
 SCARS (disambiguation)

fr:Scar
it:Scar (disambigua)
pl:Blizna (ujednoznacznienie)
pt:Scar
tr:Scar